Jack Prince (6 June 1906 – 13 October 1971) was an English football goalkeeper who played for Nantwich, Oldham Athletic, Port Vale, Rochdale, Wrexham, Shrewsbury Town, Northwich Victoria, and Crewe Alexandra. He won the Third Division North title with Port Vale in 1929–30.

Career
Prince played for Nantwich and Oldham Athletic, before joining Port Vale in May 1928. His debut came on Potteries derby day; a 2–1 defeat to Stoke City at the Victoria Ground on 15 September 1928. Taking the number 1 jersey from Alf Bennett, he enjoyed a spell as the first choice keeper, playing 32 league and cup games as the "Valiants" were relegated out of the Second Division in 1928–29. He lost his first team place to Ben Davies in November 1929, and only featured 12 times as Vale won the Third Division North title in 1929–30. He was released from The Old Recreation Ground in May 1930, and moved on to Rochdale, Wrexham, Shrewsbury Town, Northwich Victoria and then returned to old club Nantwich, before finishing his career with his hometown club Crewe Alexandra.

Career statistics
Source:

Honours
Port Vale
Football League Third Division North: 1929–30

References

Sportspeople from Crewe
English footballers
Association football goalkeepers
Nantwich Town F.C. players
Oldham Athletic A.F.C. players
Port Vale F.C. players
Rochdale A.F.C. players
Wrexham A.F.C. players
Shrewsbury Town F.C. players
Northwich Victoria F.C. players
Crewe Alexandra F.C. players
English Football League players
1906 births
1971 deaths